Hurricane Betsy, known as Hurricane Santa Clara in Puerto Rico, was the first North Atlantic hurricane to make landfall in Puerto Rico in 24 years. The third tropical cyclone of the 1956 Atlantic hurricane season, Betsy developed from a tropical wave on August 9 to the east of the Lesser Antilles. It rapidly developed into a  major hurricane before striking Guadeloupe. There, Betsy heavily damaged 1000 houses and left severe crop destruction, and there were 18 deaths in the territory. As Betsy continued into the northeastern Caribbean, it capsized a ship, killing its crew of two.

On August 12, Betsy struck southeastern Puerto Rico and quickly crossed the island. Damage was heaviest where it moved ashore and in the territory's central portion, and throughout Puerto Rico there were 15,023 houses that were destroyed by Betsy. Multiple locations reported heavy crop damage, including Camuy which reported a complete loss of the corn crop. Hurricane Betsy was the first hurricane to be observed from the San Juan radar, and also resulted in the first hurricane warning on the island to be released on television. The hurricane left $40 million in damage and 16 deaths, which prompted a federally declared disaster area. Locally the hurricane was known as the Santa Clara Hurricane. After exiting Puerto Rico, Betsy brushed the Bahamas before turning northeastward, becoming extratropical on August 18. The remnants dissipated two days later to the south of Newfoundland.

Meteorological history

Before Betsy's formation, the northeastward shift of the Azores High allowed for an increase in atmospheric instability across the tropical Atlantic, which made conditions for tropical cyclogenesis more favorable in early August. A tropical wave exited the west coast of Africa on August 4. On August 9, a ship reported rough seas and winds of force 10 on the Beaufort scale. After maintaining that intensity for about 24 hours, Betsy began weakening, moving directly over Marie-Galante and southern Guadeloupe. It entered the eastern Caribbean with winds of  before it began a track to the west-northwest.

This made Betsy the first hurricane to strike the island since the 1932 San Ciprian hurricane. It crossed the central portion of the island, and the structure deteriorated and the eye became difficult to locate as Betsy crossed the highest mountains. On two occasions the eye dropped slightly to the south because of the mountains. The eye became well-defined as it approached the coast, and Betsy emerged on the northwest coast near Camuy at a similar intensity as when it moved ashore. That day, the eye passed near Grand Turk Island and San Salvador Island. By that time, the storm had increased in size; the Hurricane Hunters reported that the gale-force winds extended  to its north. The next day, Betsy turned to the northeast due to an approaching trough. The eye became increasingly poorly defined, and Betsy weakened to a tropical storm on August 18 to the south of Nova Scotia. Turning to the east, it became extratropical later that day, eventually dissipating on August 20.

Impact

When the first advisory was issued on Betsy, a hurricane watch was issued from Barbados to Antigua. Around that time, a hurricane watch was also issued for Puerto Rico and the United States Virgin Islands, which was later upgraded to a hurricane warning. This was the first hurricane warning in Puerto Rico to be aired on television.

The communications throughout the territory were disrupted. The high winds destroyed upwards of 60% of the banana, breadfruit, coconut, and papaya crop, which severely impacted the economy. Across the French West Indies, the hurricane resulted in 18 deaths and caused $10 million in damage, $3.5 million of which from crop damage. In nearby Dominica, winds reached . In Saint Croix, the hurricane dropped , while winds reached . In the northeastern Caribbean, Betsy capsized a ship and killed its crew of two. Another ship in the region drifted for several days south of Saint Croix due to a damaged engine.

When Betsy crossed Puerto Rico, it produced hurricane-force winds across the entire territory except in the southwest corner. Sustained winds reached  in San Juan, and Ramey Air Force Base on the island's northwestern portion recorded  wind gusts. The high winds downed a significant number of trees in the island's interior due to the funneling within valleys. In Aibonito, the winds destroyed 1000 houses and damaged another 500, and in nearby Comerío the winds severely damaged or destroyed 1285 dwellings. In Jayuya in the central portion of the island, the hurricane left severe crop damage, including a complete loss to the banana crop. However, damage was heaviest in Yabucoa near where Betsy moved ashore, due to a slight oscillation of the eye. High winds caused severe damage in a  radius. In Yabucoa, over 12,000 people were left homeless, and damage totaled $8 million. Damage was likewise severe where Betsy moved offshore in Camuy, with a complete loss to the corn crop, 95% of the avocado, 65% of breadfruit, and 50% of the coffee crop ruined. Across Puerto Rico, Betsy destroyed 15,023 houses and left $40 million in damage. There were sixteen deaths on the island, which was less than expected due to well-heeded warnings. There were also 24 injuries in the territory related to the storm. Betsy was the first hurricane on record to be observed from the San Juan radar. On the island, it is known as the Santa Clara hurricane. Due to the damage, U.S. President Dwight Eisenhower declared Puerto Rico as a disaster area on August 18, which allocated millions of dollars in assistance. The Puerto Rican governor allocated $6.7 million of funding to aid in rebuilding.

Betsy destroyed several houses and wrecked the roofs of several churches. Hurricane Betsy left about $380,000 in damage in the Bahamas. While delivering relief supplies to San Salvador Air Force Base, a Douglas C-124A-DL Globemaster II operated by the U.S. Air Force crashed. The plane had a right landing gear fail and as the result the plane skidded down the runway and came to a stop. One person was killed. Due to uncertainty in the storm's movement, officials issued a hurricane warning for southern Florida.

In the Grand Banks offshore Canada, the hurricane sunk a ship, although the entire crew was rescued.

See also
 
 List of Atlantic hurricanes
 Atlantic hurricane season
 1956 Atlantic hurricane season

References

Betsy
Betsy 1956
Betsy 1956
Betsy 1956
Betsy 1956
Betsy 1956
Betsy 1956
Betsy 1956
Betsy 1956
Betsy 1956
Betsy 1956
1956 meteorology
1956 in the Caribbean